WISE J064723.23−623235.5 (abbreviated WISE 0647−6232) is a nearby brown dwarf of spectral type Y1 ± 0.5, located in constellation Pictor at approximately 28 light-years from Earth. It is one of the two or three reddest and one of the four latest-type brown dwarfs known.

History of observations

Discovery
WISE 0647−6232 was discovered by Kirkpatrick et al. from data, collected by Wide-field Infrared Survey Explorer (WISE) Earth-orbiting satellite — NASA infrared-wavelength 40-cm (16-in) space telescope, which mission lasted from December 2009 to February 2011. The discovery was announced in 2013.

WISE 0647−6232 was first imaged by WISE on 9 May 2010. On 17 June 2010 after preliminary data processing it was uncovered as a very cold brown dwarf candidate.

Then were carried out follow-up observations:
using the Infrared Array Camera (IRAC) on Spitzer Space Telescope, starting from MJD 55458.43 (possibly 16 September 2010);
J- and H-band images using Persson's Auxiliary Nasmyth Infrared Camera (PANIC) at the 6.5-meter Magellan Baade telescope at the Las Campanas Observatory, Chile, on 25 November 2010;
with the FourStar infrared camera also at Magellan Baade telescope on 15 January 2013 and 23 March 2013;
with the Folded-port InfraRed Echellette (FIRE) spectrograph also at Magellan Baade telescope on 24 March 2013;
using the Wide Field Camera 3 (WFC3) on Hubble Space Telescope on 13–14 May 2013, and pre-image was obtained on 11 February 2013.

On 25 August 2013 Kirkpatrick et al. submitted the discovery paper to The Astrophysical Journal.

WISE 0647−6232 became the 17th Y-type dwarf discovered and confirmed spectroscopically (in addition, WD 0806-661B is also almost certainly a Y-type dwarf, which was found before discovery of WISE 0647−6232, but it still lacks a spectroscopical confirmation).

Distance
Currently the most accurate distance estimate of WISE 0647−6232 is a trigonometric parallax, published in 2019 by Kirkpatrick et al.:  pc, or  ly.		

The best estimate is marked in bold.

Properties
WISE 0647−6232 has effective temperature 350–400 K and mass ∼, but its kinematics suggests that it may belong to Columba moving group (probability of this is 92.9%, and corresponding radial velocity should be ∼22 km/s), if it is so, it may be very young (~30 Myr) and have even lower mass (<). Its blue J − H color may suggest that its surface gravity may be relatively low (log(g)=3.0–3.5, where g is in units of cm·s−2). For ages from 0.1 to more than 10 Gyr log(g)=4.0–5.0.

The only redder than WISE 0647−6232 confirmed Y dwarf is WISE 1828+2650. WD 0806-661B may also be redder than WISE 0647−6232.

The other three latest-type Y dwarfs are: WISE 0350−5658 (Y1), WISE 0535−7500 (≥Y1) and WISE 1828+2650 (≥Y2).

See also
 List of star systems within 25–30 light-years

References

Pictor (constellation)
Brown dwarfs
Y-type stars
WISE objects
20100617